Esther Saville Allen (Saville; pen names, Winnie Woodbine, Etta Saville, Mrs. S. R. Allen; December 11, 1837 - July 16, 1913) was an American author of the long nineteenth century. In her day, Allen was probably the author of more works, both in prose and verse, than any other woman in Arkansas. She died in 1913.

Biography
Esther (nickname, "Etta") Saville was born in Honeoye, New York on December 11, 1837. Her parents were Joseph and Esther Redfern Saville, both from England. Her father contributed to British journals of his time. Before Esther Saville was ten years old, she made her first public effort in a poem, which was published. At the age of 12 years, she wrote for Morris and Willis a poem which they published in the "Home Journal." While studying in Western New York and Rushford, New York, she wrote and published many poems under the pen-name, "Winnie Woodbine."

She became a teacher in the public schools of western New York and continued to write for eastern papers, assuming her proper name, "Etta Saville." She moved to Illinois in 1857 and she taught in public schools there until she married in 1859. After her marriage to Samuel R. Allen, a lawyer in Erie, Illinois, all her literary productions appeared under the name of "Mrs. S. R. Allen." In 1872, she removed to Little Rock, Arkansas. Much of her work has been widely copied and recopied. Devoted to charity, organized and practical, her writings in that cause promoted the institution and development of useful work, or revived and reinvigorated it. 

She died at Little Rock, Arkansas, July 16, 1913, and was buried next to her husband in the Little Rock National Cemetery. At the time, she was the only woman to be buried in the local National Cemetery.

Selected works

Poems
 "The Home Coming"
 "Home Again", 1908

Short stories
 "The French School"

References

Bibliography

External links
 
 

1837 births
1913 deaths
19th-century American writers
19th-century American women writers
19th-century pseudonymous writers
People from Honeoye, New York
Writers from New York (state)
Pseudonymous women writers
Wikipedia articles incorporating text from A Woman of the Century